Agylloides problematica is a moth of the  subfamily Arctiinae. It was described by Strand in 1912. It is found in Cameroon.

References

Endemic fauna of Cameroon
Moths described in 1912
Lithosiini
Insects of Cameroon
Moths of Africa